Micafungin, sold under the brand name Mycamine, is an echinochandin antifungal medication used to treat and prevent invasive fungal infections including candidemia, abscesses, and esophageal candidiasis. It inhibits the production of beta-1,3-glucan, an essential component of fungal cell walls that is not found in mammals. Micafungin is administered intravenously. It received final approval from the U.S.  Food and Drug Administration (FDA) in March 2005, and gained approval in the European Union in April 2008.

It is on the World Health Organization's List of Essential Medicines.

Indications 
Micafungin is indicated for the treatment of candidemia, acute disseminated candidiasis, Candida peritonitis, abscesses and esophageal candidiasis. Since January 23, 2008, micafungin has been approved for the prophylaxis of Candida infections in patients undergoing hematopoietic stem cell transplantation (HSCT).

Micafungin works by way of concentration-dependent inhibition of 1,3-beta-D-glucan synthase resulting in reduced formation of 1,3-beta-D-glucan, which is an essential polysaccharide comprising one-third of the majority of Candida spp. cell walls. This decreased glucan production leads to osmotic instability and thus cellular lysis.

Dosage 
The metabolism of micafungin occurs hepatically via acryp sulfatase followed by secondary metabolism by a transferase. Precautions should be taken with regards to dosing, as micafungin weakly inhibits CYP3A4.

Dosage forms 
Micafungin is a natural antifungal product derived from other fungi as a defense mechanism for competition of nutrients, etc. To be specific, micafungin is derived from FR901379, and is produced by Coleophoma empetri.

References

Further reading

External links 
 

Antifungals
Echinocandins
Astellas Pharma
World Health Organization essential medicines